Bells Mills Bridge is a historic wooden covered bridge in Sewickley Township and South Huntingdon Township, Westmoreland County, Pennsylvania. It features pedimented gables and plain pilasters in the Greek Revival style. It crosses Sewickley Creek.

It was listed on the National Register of Historic Places in 1980.

References

External links
 

Covered bridges on the National Register of Historic Places in Pennsylvania
Historic American Buildings Survey in Pennsylvania
Greek Revival architecture in Pennsylvania
Covered bridges in Westmoreland County, Pennsylvania
Bridges completed in 1850
Wooden bridges in Pennsylvania
Bridges in Westmoreland County, Pennsylvania
National Register of Historic Places in Westmoreland County, Pennsylvania
Road bridges on the National Register of Historic Places in Pennsylvania
Burr Truss bridges in the United States